The Boston Celtics are an American professional basketball team based in Boston. The Celtics compete in the National Basketball Association (NBA) as a member of the league's Eastern Conference Atlantic Division. Founded in 1946 as one of the league's original eight teams, the Celtics play their home games at TD Garden, which is also the home of the National Hockey League's Boston Bruins. The Celtics are one of the most successful basketball teams in NBA history. The franchise is one of two teams with 17 NBA Championships, the other franchise being the Los Angeles Lakers. The Celtics currently hold the record for the most recorded wins of any NBA team.

The Celtics have a notable rivalry with the Los Angeles Lakers, which was heavily highlighted throughout the 1960s and 1980s. During the two teams' many match-ups in the 1980s, the Celtics' star, Larry Bird, and the Lakers' star, Magic Johnson, had an ongoing feud. The franchise has played the Lakers a record 12 times in the NBA Finals (including recent appearances in 2008 and 2010), of which the Celtics have won nine. Four Celtics players (Bob Cousy, Bill Russell, Dave Cowens and Larry Bird) have won the NBA Most Valuable Player Award for an NBA record total of 10 MVP awards. Both the nickname "Celtics" and their mascot "Lucky the Leprechaun" are a nod to Boston's historically large Irish population, and also to the Original Celtics, a marquee team prior to the NBA.

The Celtics' rise to dominance began in the late 1950s, after the team, led by coach Red Auerbach, acquired center Bill Russell, who would become the cornerstone of the Celtics dynasty, in a draft-day trade in 1956. Led by Russell and point guard Bob Cousy, the Celtics won their first NBA championship in 1957. Russell, along with a talented supporting cast of future Hall of Famers including John Havlicek, Tom Heinsohn, K. C. Jones, Sam Jones, Satch Sanders, and Bill Sharman, would usher the Celtics into the greatest period in franchise history, winning eight consecutive NBA championships from 1959 to 1966. After Russell retired in 1969, the team entered a period of rebuilding. In the mid-1970s, the Celtics became contenders once again, winning two championships in 1974 and 1976 under the leadership of center Dave Cowens, forward John Havlicek, and point guard Jo Jo White.

In the 1980s, the Celtics returned to dominance, as well as renewed competition with the "Showtime" Lakers, who were led by Magic Johnson and Kareem Abdul-Jabbar. Anchored by the "Big Three" of Larry Bird, Kevin McHale, and Robert Parish, the Celtics won championships in 1981, 1984, and 1986. The team defeated the Lakers in the 1984 Finals, but lost to Los Angeles in 1985 and 1987. After the departure of Parish as a free agent, the retirement of both Bird and McHale, as well as the untimely death of star player Reggie Lewis, the team struggled through the 1990s and much of the early 2000s. It was not until the Celtics assembled a new "Big Three" of Kevin Garnett, Paul Pierce, and Ray Allen that they found success once again. Under the leadership of head coach Doc Rivers, the team beat the Lakers to win a championship in 2008, but lost to Los Angeles in a seven-game series in 2010, the latest Finals matchup between the two ancient rivals.

By the start of the 2013–14 season, none of the new "Big Three" were still with the team. Kevin Garnett and Paul Pierce were traded away to the Brooklyn Nets, while Allen left as a free agent. After a period of rebuilding, the Celtics became a force again under head coach Brad Stevens. During the 2016–17 season, the Celtics clinched the top seed in the Eastern Conference, but were eliminated in the Conference Finals. Led by Jaylen Brown and Jayson Tatum, the team returned to the Conference Finals in 2018 and 2020, and broke through to the NBA Finals in 2022, losing to the Golden State Warriors.

Franchise history

1946–1950: Early years
The Boston Celtics were formed on June 6, 1946, by Boston Garden-Arena Corporation president Walter A. Brown as a team in the Basketball Association of America. In 1948, the team earned its first playoff appearance, only to lose to the Chicago Stags 4–1. In 1949, the team missed the playoffs, fifth in the Eastern Division. Then, on August 3, 1949, the team became part of the National Basketball Association after the absorption of the National Basketball League by the BAA. In 1950, the Celtics signed Chuck Cooper, becoming the first NBA franchise to draft a black player. Chuck Connors of The Rifleman fame was an original member of the Celtics in 1946.

1950–1957: Arrival of Bob Cousy and Red Auerbach

The Celtics struggled during their early years, until the hiring of coach Red Auerbach. In the franchise's early days, Auerbach had no assistants, ran all the practices, did all the scouting—both of opposing teams and college draft prospects—and scheduled all road trips. One of the first great players to join the Celtics was Bob Cousy, whom Auerbach initially refused to draft out of nearby Holy Cross because he was "too flashy". Cousy's contract eventually became the property of the Chicago Stags, but when that franchise went bankrupt, Cousy went to the Celtics in a dispersal draft.

After the 1955–56 season, Auerbach made a stunning trade, sending perennial All-Star Ed Macauley to the St. Louis Hawks along with the draft rights to Cliff Hagan for the second overall pick in the draft. After negotiating with the Rochester Royals—a negotiation that included a promise that the Celtics owner would send the highly sought-after Ice Capades to Rochester if the Royals would let Russell slide to No. 2—Auerbach used the pick to select University of San Francisco center Bill Russell. Auerbach also acquired Holy Cross standout, and 1957 NBA Rookie of the Year, Tom Heinsohn. Russell and Heinsohn worked extraordinarily well with Cousy, and they were the players around whom Auerbach would build the champion Celtics for more than a decade.

1956–1969: Bill Russell era

With Bill Russell, the Celtics advanced to the 1957 NBA Finals and defeated the St. Louis Hawks in seven games, the first of a record 17 championships. Russell went on to win 11 championships, making him the most decorated player in NBA history. In 1958, the Celtics again advanced to the NBA Finals, this time losing to the Hawks in 6 games. However, with the acquisition of K.C. Jones that year, the Celtics began a dynasty that would last for more than a decade. In 1959, the Celtics won the NBA Championship after sweeping the Minneapolis Lakers, the first of their record eight consecutive championships.

During that time, the Celtics met the Lakers in the Finals five times, starting an intense and often bitter rivalry that has spanned generations. In 1964, the Celtics became the first NBA team to have an all African-American starting lineup. On December 26, 1964, Willie Naulls replaced an injured Tom Heinsohn, joining Tom 'Satch' Sanders, K.C. Jones, Sam Jones, and Bill Russell in the starting lineup. The Celtics defeated St. Louis 97–84. Boston won its next 11 games with Naulls starting in place of Heinsohn. The Celtics of the late 1950s–1960s are widely considered one of the most dominant teams of all time.

Auerbach retired as coach after the 1965–66 season and Russell took over as player-coach, which was Auerbach's ploy to keep Russell interested. With his appointment Russell became the first African-American coach in any U.S. pro sport. Auerbach would remain the general manager, a position he would hold well into the 1980s. However, the Celtics' string of NBA titles ended when they lost to the Philadelphia 76ers in the 1967 Eastern Conference Finals. The aging team managed two more championships in 1968 and 1969, defeating the Los Angeles Lakers each time. Russell retired after the 1969 season, effectively ending a Celtics dynasty that had garnered an unrivaled 11 NBA titles in 13 seasons. The team's run of 8 consecutive is the longest championship streak in U.S. professional sports history.

1970–1978: Cowens–Havlicek–White era

The 1969–70 season was a rebuilding year, as the Celtics had their first losing record since the 1949–50 season. However, with the acquisition of Paul Silas and future Hall of Famers Dave Cowens and Jo Jo White, the Celtics soon became dominant again. After losing in the Eastern Conference Finals in 1972, the Celtics regrouped and came out determined in 1973 and posted an excellent 68–14 regular-season record. But the season ended in disappointment, as they were upset in seven games by the New York Knicks in the Conference Finals. John Havlicek injured his right shoulder in game six and was forced to play game seven shooting left-handed. The Celtics returned to the playoffs the next year, defeating the Milwaukee Bucks in the 1974 NBA Finals for their 12th NBA Championship. Boston took a 3–2 series lead and had a chance to claim the title on their home court. The Bucks won Game Six in Boston when Kareem Abdul-Jabbar nestled in a hook shot with 3 seconds left in the game's second overtime, and the series returned to Milwaukee. Cowens was the hero in Game 7, scoring 28 points, as the Celtics brought the title back to Boston for the first time in five years.

In 1976, the team won yet another championship, defeating the Phoenix Suns in six games. The Finals featured one of the greatest games in NBA history. With the series tied at two games apiece, the Suns trailed early in the Boston Garden, but came back to force overtime. In double overtime, a Gar Heard turn-around jumper at the top of the key sent the game to a third overtime, at which point the Celtics prevailed. After the 1976 championship and a playoff appearance in 1977, Boston went into another rebuilding phase. In the 1977 NBA draft, the Celtics drafted a young forward from UNC Charlotte named Cedric Maxwell. "Cornbread" Maxwell did not contribute much in his rookie season, but he showed promise. Auerbach's job became even tougher following the 1977–78 season in which they went 32–50 as Havlicek, the Celtics' all-time leading scorer, retired after 16 seasons.

The Celtics owned two of the top eight picks in the 1978 NBA draft. Auerbach took a risk by selecting junior Larry Bird of Indiana State with the sixth overall pick, knowing that Bird would stay in college for his senior year but believing that his potential would make him worth the wait. The team retained Bird's rights for one year and signed him soon after he led Indiana State to the NCAA championship game. In 1978, Celtics owner Irv Levin traded franchises with Buffalo Braves owner John Y. Brown Jr.. Two weeks before the swap of franchises was made official, details of a six-player trade between the two teams were reported. Boston sent Freeman Williams, Kevin Kunnert, and Kermit Washington to the Braves for "Tiny" Archibald, Billy Knight, and Marvin Barnes. The move turned Boston fans against Brown, both because Kunnert and Washington were seen as key pieces of the team's future and because Auerbach publicly stated that he was not consulted about the trade.

1979–1992: Larry Bird era
The relationship between Brown and Auerbach worsened with Brown's decision to acquire Bob McAdoo in February 1979, in exchange for three first-round draft picks that Auerbach had planned to use to rebuild the franchise. Again, Brown made the trade without consulting Auerbach. Auerbach almost left Boston to take a job with the New York Knicks as a result. With public support strongly behind Auerbach, Brown sold the team to Harry Mangurian in 1979 rather than run the risk of losing his famed general manager. The Celtics would struggle through the season, going 29–53. Newcomers Chris Ford, Rick Robey, Cedric Maxwell and Nate Archibald failed to reverse the team's momentum.

Larry Bird debuted for the Celtics during the 1979–80 season. With a new owner in place, Auerbach made a number of moves that would bring the team back to prominence. He almost immediately traded McAdoo, a former NBA scoring champion, to the Detroit Pistons for guard M. L. Carr, a defensive specialist, and two first-round picks in the 1980 NBA draft. He also picked up point guard Gerald Henderson from the CBA. Carr, Archibald, Henderson and Ford formed a highly competent backcourt, blending in well with the talented frontcourt of Cowens, Maxwell and Bird. With Bird winning NBA Rookie of the Year honors the team went 61–21, a 32-game improvement from the previous season. Playing strong in the playoffs, the Celtics fell to the Philadelphia 76ers in the Eastern Conference Finals. 

After the season, Auerbach completed one of the most lopsided trades in NBA history, garnering a pair of future Hall of Famers for a pair of first-round draft picks. Seeking to improve the team immediately, Auerbach sent the team's two first-round draft picks to the Golden State Warriors for both center Robert Parish and the Warriors' first round pick. He then used the pick the Celtics obtained from Golden State to select University of Minnesota power forward Kevin McHale. The "Big Three" of Bird, McHale and Parish played together for the Celtics until 1992, won three NBA championships together, and were later described as the best NBA frontcourt of all time.

Despite losing center Dave Cowens to retirement late in training camp, the Celtics went 62–20 under coach Bill Fitch in 1980–81. Once again, the Celtics faced the 76ers in the Eastern Conference Finals, falling behind 3–1 before coming back to win Game Seven, 91–90. The Celtics went on to win the 1981 NBA Championship over the Houston Rockets, with Maxwell being named NBA Finals MVP.

Following the 1981–82 season, the Celtics once again met the 76ers in the playoffs. This time, they lost in seven games. In 1983 the Celtics were swept in the playoffs (a first for the franchise) by the Milwaukee Bucks; afterwards, Fitch resigned and the team was sold to new owners led by Don Gaston.

In 1983–84, the Celtics under new coach K. C. Jones would go 62–20 and return to the NBA Finals after a three-year hiatus. Boston came back from a 2–1 deficit to defeat the Lakers for their 15th championship. Bird renewed his college rivalry with Lakers star Magic Johnson during this series. After the season, Auerbach officially retired as general manager, but maintained the position of team president. He was succeeded by Jan Volk.

In 1985, the Lakers and Celtics met again in the Finals, with the Lakers winning. This was the first time the Lakers had defeated the Celtics in the Finals and the only time the team had won a championship at Boston Garden. During the following off-season, the Celtics acquired Bill Walton from the Los Angeles Clippers in exchange for Cedric Maxwell. Walton had been an All-Star and league MVP while leading the Portland Trail Blazers to the 1977 NBA championship, but injuries had hobbled him since. Considered the best passing center in NBA history, he stayed healthy and was a big part of the Celtics' success in 1986.

The Celtics won the second pick in the 1986 NBA draft and drafted University of Maryland star Len Bias, one of the most heralded prospects of his era. Bias died 36 hours later of an accidental cocaine overdose. Despite the tragedy, the Celtics remained competitive in 1986–87, going 59–23 and again winning the Eastern Conference Championship. They were defeated in the Finals by the Lakers in six games.

In 1988, the Celtics lost in six games to the Detroit Pistons in the Eastern Conference Finals. Following the season, head coach K.C. Jones retired and was replaced by assistant Jimmy Rodgers. Boston's hopes for 1988–89 faded when Bird underwent a procedure to remove bone spurs in his feet early in the season, and the Celtics won just 42 games before a first-round playoff defeat to the Pistons. Bird returned in 1989–90 and led the Celtics to a 52–30 record. In the playoffs, the Celtics collapsed after winning the first two games in a best-of-five series against the New York Knicks, losing three straight games and the series. After the playoffs, Rodgers was fired and replaced by assistant coach and former Celtics player Chris Ford.

Under Ford's leadership, the Celtics improved to 56–26 in 1990–91, recapturing the Atlantic Division title even though Bird missed 22 games with several injuries. The Celtics again lost to the Pistons in the playoffs. In 1992, a late-season rally allowed a 51–31 Celtics team to catch the New York Knicks and repeat as Atlantic Division champions. After sweeping the Indiana Pacers in the first round, the Celtics lost a seven-game Eastern Conference Semifinals series to the Cleveland Cavaliers. Back injuries limited Bird to only 45 regular-season games, and just four of ten in the playoffs. After thirteen NBA seasons and a gold medal at the Barcelona Olympics with the Dream Team, continued back trouble led Bird to retire in 1992.

1993–1998: Rebuilding years
The loss of Bird and the aging of the team's other veteran stars forced coach Chris Ford into rebuilding mode. Hopes centered on 26-year-old Reggie Lewis, a small forward out of Boston's Northeastern University. In the first round of the 1993 playoffs Lewis fainted during Boston's four-game series loss by the Charlotte Hornets. An examination revealed heart problems, but Lewis was able to get doctors to clear him for a comeback. Before he could make it he died of a heart attack while shooting baskets at Brandeis University during the off-season. The Celtics honored his memory by retiring his number 35. With McHale having retired after the Celtics' playoff loss to the Hornets, Boston's original Big 3 era came to an end in 1994 upon Robert Parish's signing with Charlotte. The team collapsed, finishing out of the playoffs with a 32–50 mark.

In 1994, the Celtics hired former player and legendary towel-waving cheerleader M. L. Carr as the team's new vice president of basketball operations. Working alongside general manager Jan Volk, Carr selected University of North Carolina star Eric Montross with Boston's first-round pick in the 1994 NBA draft. Montross became the new heir apparent in the paint, but failed to develop and was eventually traded. 1994–95 was the Celtics' final season in the Boston Garden. The Celtics signed aging Dominique Wilkins as a free agent, who led the team in scoring with 17.8 PPG. Second-year player Dino Rađa, a power forward from Croatia, added an interior presence the team had been lacking in 1993–94. The Celtics made the playoffs, losing to the heavily favored Orlando Magic in four games. In 1995, the Celtics moved from the Boston Garden to the Fleet Center (later TD BankNorth, then TD Garden). Carr fired Chris Ford and took the coaching reins himself. After drafting Providence College star Eric Williams, the Celtics struggled to a 33–49 record.

Things got worse in 1996–97 as the Celtics lost a franchise-record 67 games, setting an unwanted NBA record winning only once against other Atlantic Division teams and just fifteen victories overall. In spite of the emergence of 1st-round draft pick Antoine Walker, Carr's resigned after the season ended, while Rick Pitino was hired to join the franchise as the team's president, director of basketball operations, and head coach, reportedly on a $70 million ten-year contract. Volk resigned on May 7, 1997. Pitino's appointment as team president was controversial as Auerbach, the incumbent who had filled that role for more than 25 years, first heard about the change from local media. Unfortunately for the franchise, Pitino was not the savior everyone hoped he would be. Auerbach bore the insult of being elbowed out with dignity, even as the team failed to improve.

The Celtics received the third and sixth draft picks in the 1997 NBA draft, and used the picks to select a brand new backcourt through Chauncey Billups and Ron Mercer. The young team that lost 67 games the year before was dismantled, with David Wesley, Dino Rađa and Rick Fox being let go, and Williams traded to the Denver Nuggets for a pair of second round draft picks (Williams would return to the Celtics in 1999 and played for four years). Walter McCarty was also acquired in a trade with the Knicks. With a promising start, upsetting the defending champions Chicago Bulls at home on opening night, and hard play from the youngsters that led to leaderships in turnovers and steals, the team improved its victories from 15 to 36 despite many losing streaks. Billups was subsequently traded to the Raptors during his rookie year, and Mercer was traded to the Nuggets during his third season.

1998–2013: Paul Pierce era

The following year in the 1998 NBA draft, the Celtics drafted Paul Pierce, a college star who had been expected to be drafted much earlier than the Celtics' 10th overall pick. Pierce had an immediate impact during the lockout-shortened 1998–99 season, averaging 19.5 points and being named Rookie of The Month in February as he led the league in steals. However, the Celtics continued to struggle as Pitino failed to achieve meaningful success. After Boston lost to the Toronto Raptors on March 1, 2000, on a buzzer-beater by Vince Carter, Pitino delivered the memorable "walking through that door" speech, invoking Bird, McHale and Parish, which has been frequently cited over the years as a reality check for organizations wrestling with bygone glory. He resigned in January 2001.

Following the resignation of Rick Pitino, the Celtics saw modest improvement under coach Jim O'Brien. Paul Pierce matured into an NBA star and was ably complemented by Antoine Walker and the other players acquired over the years. While the team was 12–21 when Pitino left, O'Brien's record to finish the season was 24–24. Following the 2000–01 season O'Brien was given the job of head coach on a permanent basis. As a result of numerous trades, the Celtics had three picks in the 2001 NBA draft. They selected Joe Johnson, Joe Forte, and Kedrick Brown. Only Johnson managed to succeed in the NBA, becoming a perennial All-Star after leaving the Celtics.

The Celtics entered the 2001–02 season with low expectations. The team's success in the latter stages of 2000–01 was largely forgotten, and critics were surprised when the team, along with the New Jersey Nets, surged to the top of the Atlantic Division ahead of the Philadelphia 76ers, who were fresh off a trip to the NBA Finals. The Celtics won a hard-fought 5-game series with the 76ers in the first round, 3–2. Pierce scored 46 points in the series-clinching blowout at the Fleet Center. In the Conference Semifinals, the Celtics defeated the favored Detroit Pistons 4–1. In their first trip to the Eastern Conference Finals since 1988, the Celtics jumped out to a 2–1 series lead over the Nets, after rallying from 21 points down in the fourth quarter to win Game 3, but would lose the next three games to fall 4–2.

In 2003, the Celtics were sold by owner Paul Gaston to Boston Basketball Partners L.L.C., led by H. Irving Grousbeck, Wycliffe Grousbeck and Steve Pagliuca. The team made it back to the playoffs but were swept by the Nets in the second round, despite bringing Game 4 to double overtime. Before their elimination, the team hired former Celtics' guard Danny Ainge as general manager, moving Chris Wallace to another position in the organization. Ainge believed the team had reached its peak and promptly sent Antoine Walker to the Dallas Mavericks (along with Tony Delk). In return, the Celtics received the often-injured Raef LaFrentz, Chris Mills, Jiří Welsch, and a first-round pick in 2004. The Celtics made the playoffs, only to be swept in the first round by the Indiana Pacers, losing all four games.

2004–2007: Arrival of Doc Rivers

The Celtics were a young team under new coach Doc Rivers during the 2004–05 season, having drafted youngsters Al Jefferson, Delonte West and Tony Allen in the 2004 Draft. Yet they seemed to have a core of good young players, led by Pierce and rookie Al Jefferson, to go along with a group of able veterans. The Celtics went 45–37 and won their first Atlantic Division title since 1991–92, receiving a boost from returning star Antoine Walker in mid-season. The Pacers defeated them in the first round yet again, with the series culminating in an embarrassing 27-point loss in Game 7 at the Fleet Center. After the season Walker was traded again, this time to the Miami Heat. Despite Pierce's career season, in which he averaged career-highs in points (26.8), the Celtics missed the playoffs with a 33–49 record, owing largely to a young roster and constant roster shuffling, which saw the likes of Marcus Banks, Ricky Davis and Mark Blount traded for underachieving former first-overall pick Michael Olowokandi and former all-star Wally Szczerbiak.

The Celtics continued to rebuild in the 2006 NBA draft. The Celtics selected Kentucky point guard Rajon Rondo, who was to become a key piece in the team's revival. In the second round the Celtics added center Leon Powe. The 2006–07 season was a gloomy one for the franchise, starting with the death of Red Auerbach at 89. Auerbach was one of the few remaining people who had been a part of the NBA since its inception in 1946. The Celtics went 2–22 from late December 2006 through early February 2007 after losing Pierce to injury, the result of a stress reaction in his left foot. At first, the Celtics received a much-needed boost from guard Tony Allen but he tore his ACL and MCL on a needless dunk attempt after the whistle. The Celtics compiled a record of 24–58, second-worst in the NBA, including a franchise-record 18-game losing streak. At the end of the season, the Celtics, with the second-worst record in the NBA, were at least hopeful that they could secure a high draft pick and select either Greg Oden or Kevin Durant to help rebuild the franchise, but the Celtics fell to fifth in the Draft Lottery.

2007–2012: New "Big Three": Pierce, Allen, and Garnett era
In the summer of 2007, general manager Danny Ainge made a series of moves that returned the Celtics to prominence. On draft night, he traded No. 5 pick Jeff Green, Wally Szczerbiak and Delonte West to Seattle for perennial All-Star Ray Allen and Seattle's second-round pick, which the team used to select LSU's Glen "Big Baby" Davis. The Celtics then traded Ryan Gomes, Gerald Green, Al Jefferson, Theo Ratliff, Sebastian Telfair, and a first-round draft pick to the Timberwolves in exchange for superstar power forward Kevin Garnett. These moves created a new "Big Three" of Pierce, Allen, and Garnett.

In the 2007–08 season, Celtics completed the largest single-season turnaround in NBA history. The team went 66–16 in the regular season, a 42-game improvement over its 2006–07 record. However, the team struggled in the early rounds of the playoffs, needing seven games to defeat the Atlanta Hawks in the first round and another seven to defeat the Cleveland Cavaliers in the conference semifinals. The Celtics then beat the Detroit Pistons in six games in the Eastern Conference Finals, winning two road games.

For the 11th time in league history, and for the first time since 1987, the Celtics and the Lakers faced off in the NBA Finals. The Celtics won Game One at home 98–88, fueled by strong play by Garnett and Pierce's dramatic comeback from a second-half knee injury. They won Game Two 108–102 despite nearly blowing a 24-point lead in the fourth quarter. As the series shifted to Los Angeles, the Lakers stifled Pierce and Garnett in Game Three and won 87–81. However, the Celtics would overcome a 24-point deficit in Game 4 to win 97–91, making the largest in-game comeback in NBA Finals history. After again blowing a large lead, the Lakers hung on to win Game 5 103–98, sending the series back to Boston. In Game 6, the Celtics overpowered the Lakers, winning 131–92 and clinching their 17th NBA title. Paul Pierce was named Finals MVP. With the win Celtics set a record for most games a team had ever played in a postseason with 26.

The 2008–09 Celtics started off the season at 27–2, the then-best starting record in NBA history. They also had a franchise-record 19-game streak. After the All-Star Break, Kevin Garnett was injured in a loss against the Utah Jazz and missed the last 25 games of the season. Garnett was eventually shelved for the playoffs. The 2009 Celtics still finished with 62 victories, but their playoff run would end against the Magic in the second round.

In 2009, with the return of Garnett from injury and the additions of Rasheed Wallace and Marquis Daniels, the Celtics started the season 23–5 and at one point had the best record in the NBA. However, Doc Rivers decided to lessen his aging stars' minutes to keep them fresh for the playoffs. As a result, the Celtics sputtered to an even 27–27 record the rest of the way and finished the 2009–10 regular season with a 50–32 record. Despite being the fourth seed in the Eastern Conference, the Celtics managed to make the NBA Finals. Rajon Rondo emerged as a star during postseason play. For the 12th time, the Celtics faced the Lakers in the Finals. After taking a 3–2 lead heading into Los Angeles for Game Six, the Celtics appeared poised to win their 18th title. However, starting center Kendrick Perkins suffered a severe knee injury early in Game Six, and the Celtics went on to lose the series in seven games.

During the 2010 offseason, with Perkins expected to be out until February 2011, the Celtics signed two former All-Star centers, Shaquille O'Neal and Jermaine O'Neal. Shaquille O'Neal's presence wound up leading to Perkins' departure: the Celtics were 33–10 in games Perkins had missed during the year due to injury and had a 19–3 record in games when O'Neal played over 20 minutes. Consequently, Perkins was traded to the Oklahoma City Thunder in February, when the Celtics were 41–14 and led the Eastern Conference despite another rash of injuries. Following the trade, however, they proceeded to win only 15 of their final 27 games. They finished with a 56–26 record, sliding to the third seed. The 2010–11 season still provided three landmarks: The Celtics became the second team to reach 3,000 victories, Paul Pierce became the third Celtic to score 20,000 points (the others are Larry Bird and John Havlicek), and Ray Allen broke the NBA record for most career three-pointers. The 2011 NBA playoffs started with the Celtics sweeping the New York Knicks 4–0 in the opening round. In the second round, they were ousted by eventual Eastern Conference champions Miami Heat in five games. Shaquille O'Neal, limited to 12 minutes in two games of the second round, retired at the end of the season.

The Celtics started the lockout-shortened season 0–3, as Pierce was out with a heel injury. At the All-Star break, the Celtics were below .500 with a 15–17 record. However, they were one of the hottest teams in the league after the break, going 24–10 the rest of the year and winning their fifth division title in a row. The Celtics made the playoffs as the fourth seed in the Eastern Conference. In the playoffs, the Celtics faced the Atlanta Hawks in the first round, beating them in six games led by strong play from Pierce and Garnett. In the conference semifinals, the Celtics defeated the 76ers in seven games. The Celtics faced the Miami Heat in the Eastern Conference Finals, losing in seven games to the eventual NBA champions.

The 2012 off-season started with the Celtics having only six players under contract. While Kevin Garnett was signed to a new contract, Ray Allen signed with the Miami Heat for less money than the Celtics offered; this move brought the five-year "Big Three" era to a somewhat acrimonious end. The Celtics finished the season with 41 wins. The Celtics trailed the New York Knicks 3–0 in the first round of the 2013 NBA playoffs before losing the series in six games. In Game Six, the Celtics nearly completed a comeback when they went on a 20–0 run to cut the lead to four.

2013–2016: Post-Pierce era
During the off-season, head coach Doc Rivers was allowed to terminate his contract. He departed the Celtics to coach the Los Angeles Clippers, and the Celtics received a 2015 unprotected first-round pick as compensation. A few days later, Pierce, Garnett (who waived a no-trade clause), Jason Terry, and D. J. White, were traded to the Brooklyn Nets for Keith Bogans, MarShon Brooks, Kris Humphries, Kris Joseph, Gerald Wallace, and three future first-round draft picks (2014, 2016, 2018), together with the right to swap 2017 first-round picks with Brooklyn. The deal marked the start of a youth movement for the team.

On July 3, 2013, the Celtics announced that Brad Stevens, the head coach of Butler University, would replace Doc Rivers as head coach. Halfway through the season, in January, Rajon Rondo made his return and was named the 15th Team Captain in team history, and the team furthered the youth movement by acquiring two draft picks in a three-team trade that sent Jordan Crawford and MarShon Brooks to the Golden State Warriors while the Celtics received the Heat center Joel Anthony. The 2013–14 season marked the Celtics' first missed playoffs since the "Big Three".

The next off-season, the Celtics drafted Marcus Smart with the 6th overall pick and James Young with the 17th overall pick in the 2014 NBA draft, and signed Evan Turner. The 2014–15 season had several roster moves, the most prominent being Rondo and rookie Dwight Powell traded to the Dallas Mavericks for center Brandan Wright, forward Jae Crowder, veteran point guard Jameer Nelson, and future picks. A total of 22 players spent time with the Celtics, leading scorer and rebounder Sullinger suffered a season-ending left metatarsal stress fracture, and the team was only tenth in the East with 28 games remaining. However, midseason acquisition Isaiah Thomas helped the team win 22 of their last 34 games, finishing the season with a 40–42 record, enough for the seventh seed in the Eastern Conference Playoffs. The Celtics were swept by the second seeded Cleveland Cavaliers in the first round.

In the 2015 NBA draft Boston selected Terry Rozier, R.J. Hunter, Jordan Mickey, and Marcus Thornton with the 16th, 28th, 33rd, and 45th selections respectively. During the off-season, the Celtics signed forward Amir Johnson and traded Gerald Wallace and Chris Babb in exchange for Warriors forward David Lee. The Celtics finished the 2015–16 NBA season with a 48–34 record, earning the fifth seed in the Eastern Conference. They played the fourth seed Atlanta Hawks in the first round of the playoffs. After leading by 3 points in the fourth quarter of Game 1, guard Avery Bradley went down with a hamstring injury, making him sit out for the rest of the series. The Celtics lost the series 4–2 to the Hawks, ending their season.

2016–present: Jaylen Brown and Jayson Tatum era

In the 2016 NBA draft, the Celtics selected Jaylen Brown with the third pick. At the time, he was a tenacious defender with raw athletic ability who is now an elite offensive threat. On July 8, 2016, the Celtics signed four-time All-Star Al Horford. The Celtics finished the 2016–17 season with a 53–29 record and clinched the top seed in the Eastern Conference. After a hip injury ended Thomas' impressive playoff run in game 2 of the Eastern Conference Finals, the Celtics eventually lost to the Cavaliers in five games. For the 2017 NBA draft, the Celtics won the draft lottery, earning them the first pick. They were projected to select freshman guard Markelle Fultz, but the pick was subsequently traded to the Philadelphia 76ers in exchange for the third pick in the 2017 draft and future picks. The 76ers would go on to draft Fultz, while the Celtics used the third pick to select freshman forward Jayson Tatum. Semi Ojeleye, Kadeem Allen, and Jabari Bird were selected with the 37th, 53rd, and 56th selections, respectively, in the second round. At the start of the off-season, the team signed Tatum and Ante Žižić, among others, with the biggest acquisition being the signing of Gordon Hayward. On August 22, 2017, the Celtics agreed to a deal that sent Isaiah Thomas, Jae Crowder, Žižić, and the Brooklyn Nets' 2018 first round draft pick to the Cleveland Cavaliers in exchange for Kyrie Irving. An additional draft pick (Celtics' 2020 second round) was later added to the package from the Celtics to the Cavaliers after doctors revealed that Thomas's injury was more significant than initially anticipated.

By the end of the off-season, only four Celtics' players remained from the 2016–17 team, with Marcus Smart being the longest-tenured Celtic from the 2014 NBA draft. On the team's opening night game in the first quarter against the Cavaliers, Hayward suffered a fractured tibia and dislocated ankle in his left leg, causing him to be ruled out for the rest of the regular season. Despite the loss, the Celtics went on a 16-game winning streak, which also went down as the fourth-longest winning streak in the teams' history. The streak started with a 102–92 victory over the Philadelphia 76ers on October 20 and ended on November 22 to the hands of the Miami Heat with a 104–98 loss. The Celtics finished the year with a 55–27 record, good enough for second place in the Eastern Conference. In the playoffs, they defeated the Milwaukee Bucks in the First Round in seven games, and continued the feat in the Conference Semifinals by defeating the Philadelphia 76ers in five games before losing to the Cleveland Cavaliers in seven games in the Conference Finals.

The Celtics finished the 2018–19 season with a 49–33 record. Analysts started questioning team's performance and chances for the championship when the Celtics had a 10–10 record after the first 20 games on November 24, 2018. The Celtics then won the next eight games improving their record to 18–10. During the eight-game win streak, the Celtics defeated the Cleveland Cavaliers 128–95, the New York Knicks 128–100, and also defeated the Chicago Bulls by 56 points (133–77), setting a record for the largest margin in a victory in franchise history, while also tying the record for largest victory margin by an away team. On February 9, 2019, the Celtics lost 129–128 to the Los Angeles Lakers after former Celtic Rajon Rondo hit the first game-winning shot in his NBA career. The Celtics finished the regular season place fourth in the Eastern Conference. During an April 7 game, Marcus Smart injured his hip and was ruled out for the rest of the regular season and the first round of the playoffs. In the 2019 playoffs, the Celtics swept the Indiana Pacers in the first round, and then lost to the Milwaukee Bucks in five games.

The Celtics held four picks in the 2019 NBA draft. Following a series of transactions, the team landed Romeo Langford with the 14th pick and also added Grant Williams, Carsen Edwards, and Tremont Waters (2020 G-league Rookie of the year). During the 2019 offseason, Irving and Horford signed with the Brooklyn Nets and Philadelphia 76ers, respectively. On June 30, 2019, the Celtics and point guard Kemba Walker agreed to a four-year maximum contract worth $141 million. On July 6, 2019, the Celtics officially acquired Walker in a sign and trade with the Charlotte Hornets; the Celtics sent guard Terry Rozier and a protected 2020 second-round draft pick to Charlotte in exchange for Walker and a 2020 second-round draft pick. On July 1, 2019, the Celtics agreed to a two-year contract with center Enes Kanter. On July 25, 2019, the Celtics agreed to a rookie contract with  center Tacko Fall.

Following the suspension of the 2019–20 NBA season, the Celtics were one of the 22 teams invited to the NBA Bubble to participate in the final 8 games of the regular season. In the 2020 playoffs, the Celtics swept the Philadelphia 76ers in the first round, beat the Toronto Raptors in a seven-game series, and fell to the Miami Heat in the Eastern Conference Finals in six games. Boston struggled with injuries in the 2020–21 season, with Walker, Tatum and Brown all missing games at different points in the season due to injury and COVID-19. The injury of Brown was particularly impactful as he would miss the playoffs. Boston could not automatically qualify for the playoffs and were sent to the play-in tournament where they defeated the Washington Wizards 119–100. In the playoffs they lost to the Brooklyn Nets in five games. With a highlight being Tatum's 50 point game in a Game 3 victory. After Game 4, a Celtics fan threw a plastic water bottle at Irving. When asked about it after the game, Irving talked about the "underlying racism" that leads to fans treating athletes like they are in a "human zoo". This was not the former Celtics' first time speaking out against racism in Boston. Before the playoff series, he was asked whether or not he experienced racism while in the TD Garden and responded: "I'm not the only one that could attest to this, but it's just, you know — it is what it is." Irving was not alone in sharing this sentiment. After the incident, several players shared their experience, including Celtics center Tristan Thompson, and guard Marcus Smart, who wrote about an encounter with a Celtics fan who had called him a slur in The Players' Tribune the summer before the season.

On June 2, 2021, the Celtics named head coach Brad Stevens as president of basketball operations replacing Danny Ainge after he announced his retirement. On June 18, Stevens made his first transaction in his new position trading away Kemba Walker, the 16th pick in the 2021 NBA draft, and a 2025 second-round pick in exchange for Horford, Moses Brown, and a 2023 second-round pick. The deal gave the Celtics a bit more financial flexibility with Horford due about $20 million less than Walker over the next two years. The Celtics also improved their depth in the frontcourt by adding Horford and Moses Brown, who recorded 21 points and 23 rebounds, which included 19 rebounds in the first half, in a March 27 game between the Celtics and the Thunder. On June 23, 2021, it was reported that Stevens had made the decision to hire Ime Udoka as his own replacement as head coach of the Celtics. Tatum made his third All-Star appearance off the bench at the 2022 NBA All-Star Game in Cleveland.

In April 2022, the Celtics qualified for the 2022 NBA playoffs as the second seed in the Eastern Conference, having a 51–31 record and swept the Brooklyn Nets in the first round of the postseason. They next faced the Milwaukee Bucks in the Eastern Conference Semifinals and the Miami Heat in the Eastern Conference Finals, defeating both teams in seven-game series, earning the Celtics their first Finals appearance since 2010. The Celtics took a 2–1 series lead, but lost the next three games to lose to the Golden State Warriors 4–2.

Rivalries

Los Angeles Lakers

The rivalry between the Boston Celtics and Los Angeles Lakers involves the two most storied franchises in NBA history. It has been called the NBA's best rivalry. They would go on to dominate the league in the 1960s and the 1980s, facing each other six times in the 1960s, three times in the 1980s, in 2008, and in 2010.

The Celtics have won the first eight finals meetings, while the Lakers won three of last four.

The rivalry had been less intense since the retirements of Magic Johnson and Larry Bird in the early 1990s, but in 2008 it was renewed as the Celtics and Lakers met in the Finals for the first time since 1987, with the Celtics winning the series in six games. They faced off once again in the 2010 NBA Finals which the Lakers won in seven games. The two teams are tied for the highest number of championships (17); together, the 34 championships account for almost half of the 74 championships in NBA history.

Atlanta Hawks
The Celtics–Hawks rivalry is a rivalry in the Eastern Conference of the National Basketball Association that has lasted for over five decades, although the two teams have played each other since the 1949–50 season, when the then-Tri-Cities Blackhawks joined the NBA as part of the National Basketball League and the Basketball Association of America merger. However, the Blackhawks could not field a truly competitive team until they moved to St. Louis as the St. Louis Hawks after a four-year stopover at Milwaukee. The two teams have faced each other eleven times in the NBA Playoffs, four times in the NBA Finals, with the Celtics winning ten of twelve series against the Hawks, including three out of four NBA Finals. While the Hawks have only defeated the Celtics twice out of eleven series in the NBA Playoffs, they still often managed to make their series with the Celtics memorable. The rivalry intensified in 2016 with Hawks All-Star Center Al Horford spurning the team and joining the Celtics.

Brooklyn Nets
The Boston Celtics were once rivals of the New Jersey Nets during the early 2000s due to their respective locations and their burgeoning stars. The Nets were led by Jason Kidd and Kenyon Martin, while the Celtics were experiencing newfound success behind Paul Pierce and Antoine Walker. The rivalry began to heat up in the 2002 Eastern Conference Finals, which was preceded by trash-talking from the Celtics who claimed Martin was a "fake" tough guy. Things progressed as the series started, and on-court tensions seemed to spill into the stands. Celtics' fans berated Kidd and his family with chants of "Wife Beater!" in response to Kidd's 2001 domestic abuse charge. When asked about the fan barbs being traded, Kenyon Martin stated, "Our fans hate them, their fans hate us." Bill Walton said at the time that Nets-Celtics was the "beginning of the next great NBA rivalry" during the Eastern Conference Finals in 2002 with the Nets advancing to the NBA Finals, though New Jersey would go on to sweep Boston in the 2003 playoffs. In 2012, the year the Nets returned to New York in the borough of Brooklyn, there were indications that the rivalry might be rekindled when an altercation occurred on the court on November 28, resulting in the ejection of Rajon Rondo, Gerald Wallace, and Kris Humphries. Rondo was suspended for two games in the aftermath, while Wallace and Kevin Garnett were fined. The story was revisited on December 25, when Wallace grabbed Garnett's shorts and the two had to be broken up by referees and players alike. However, the rivalry between the Nets and the Celtics appeared significantly cooled off by the June 2013 blockbuster trade that dealt Celtics stars Garnett and Paul Pierce to the Nets in exchange for Wallace, Humphries, and others. This move was billed as a merger of the two Atlantic Division teams. Celtics announcer Sean Grande said "It's almost as if you found a great home for these guys. You couldn't have found a better place. These guys will be in the New York market, they'll be on a competitive team, they'll stay on national TV. It's funny, because the enemy of my enemy is my friend. So with Celtics fans feeling the way they do about the Heat, feeling the way they do about the Knicks, the Nets are going to become almost the second [Boston] team now." The trade would end up crippling the Nets who posted a record of 151–259 following the trade including three consecutive seasons with fewer than 30 wins from 2016 to 2018. Brooklyn would win just one playoff series with Garnett and Pierce, neither of whom were with the team by the close of the 2014–2015 season. The Celtics would use Brooklyn's draft picks to acquire Jaylen Brown and Jayson Tatum through the draft in 2016 and 2017 respectively and Kyrie Irving via trade, en route to consecutive appearances in the Eastern Conference Finals in 2017 and 2018. Irving then left to the Nets in the 2019 Free Agency.

Detroit Pistons

The rivalry between the Celtics and the Detroit Pistons peaked in the 1980s, featuring players such as Larry Bird, Kevin McHale, Robert Parish, Isiah Thomas, Bill Laimbeer, Dennis Rodman, and Joe Dumars. Led by Paul Pierce, Kevin Garnett and Ray Allen in the 2008 Eastern Conference Finals the Celtics defeated the Pistons in 6 games to advance to the NBA Finals where they went on to beat the Lakers also in 6 games.

New York Knicks

The rivalry between the Celtics and the New York Knicks stems from the location of the teams, both of which are in the NBA's Atlantic division. It is one of many rivalries between Boston and New York teams. Boston and New York are also the only two original NBA franchises that have remained in the same city for the duration of their existence. The teams have played 512 games against each other during the regular season, with the Celtics winning 276 times. The two teams have also faced each other 61 times during the playoffs, with the Celtics winning 34 times.

Philadelphia 76ers

The Celtics and the Philadelphia 76ers are the two teams who have the most meetings in the NBA playoffs, playing each other in 19 series, of which the Celtics have won 12. The 76ers are considered the Celtics' biggest rival in the Eastern Conference. The rivalry reached its peak when players Bill Russell and Wilt Chamberlain of the 76ers played each other from 1965 to 1968. Their play would result in the Celtics not winning every NBA Finals series in the 1960s when the 76ers won in 1967.

Washington Wizards
One of the most recent and unexpected rivalries that has been created between the Celtics is with the Washington Wizards. Although both teams had engaged in a fight in 1984, the rivalry intensified during the 2015–16 season in a January regular-season game after Jae Crowder was given a technical foul. Crowder then began to exchange words with then Wizards coach Randy Wittman. It began to escalate that off-season when the Celtics were trying to sign Al Horford. It was publicly reported that Jae Crowder emphasized that the Celtics beat the Wizards in all of their meetings that season and should sign with them rather than Washington. In their first meeting of the 2016–17 season, Wall hit Marcus Smart in the back-court when they were up by 20 late in the 4th quarter. Wall was hit with a Flagrant 2 foul and was promptly ejected. Smart immediately got back up and began to scuffle with Wall. Their words continued even after being separated with Wall telling Smart to meet him out back after the game. No incident was reported between the two following the game. In their next meeting, the Celtics won 117–108. However, after the game Wall and Crowder exchanged words in front of the Wizards bench. Crowder ended up trying to jab his finger at Wall's nose and Wall tried to fight back with a slap. Teammates and coaches from both sides had to step in and separate the two teams but the players continued to yell while entering their respective locker rooms. Police officers had to be on guard between the two locker rooms to ensure no further confrontation. Otto Porter is quoted as calling the Celtics as dirty. Isaiah Thomas replied "If playing hard is dirty, then I guess we are a dirty team."

In their next game in January, the Wizards wore all black to enter the game. The notion was that it is similar to the attire of a funeral. Their decision worked as they defeated the Celtics 123–108. The two teams would go on to meet in the Conference Semifinals in the 2017 Playoffs. In Game 1, Markieff Morris landed on Horford's ankle after shooting a jumpshot. Morris sprained his ankle and had to miss the rest of the game which was a 123–111 loss. Morris believed that Horford did this intentionally. In Game 2, Morris retaliated by grabbing Horford by the waist and pushed him into the seats. In Game 3, Kelly Olynyk set a hard screen on Kelly Oubre. Olynyk's shoulder hit Oubre in the chin causing him to drop to the floor. Oubre angrily rose and pushed Olynyk down onto the floor. Oubre was then assessed a flagrant 2 foul and was ejected while also being suspended for Game 4. No significant altercations erupted in the rest of the seven-game series in which the Celtics would go on to win. The rivalry has since dissipated as the Celtics have retooled their roster but their match-ups are still seen as significant as they played on Christmas in 2017.

Season-by-season record
List of the last five seasons completed by the Celtics. For the full season-by-season history, see List of Boston Celtics seasons.

Note: GP = Games played, W = Wins, L = Losses, W–L% = Winning percentage

Records, retired numbers, and awards

The Celtics are tied with the Los Angeles Lakers for an NBA record 17 championships. Celtics have won 8 in a row and 11 championships in 13 years. They also have 56 playoff appearances. The Naismith Memorial Basketball Hall of Fame have 48 enshrinees who contributed to the Celtics, and the franchise has retired 23 jersey numbers, more than any other American sports team.

FIBA Hall of Fame
FIBA, the body which governs international basketball, has selected two players associated with the Celtics to the FIBA Hall of Fame for contributions to international basketball.

Home arenas

Players

Current roster

Retained draft rights
The Celtics hold the draft rights to the following unsigned draft picks who have been playing outside the NBA. A drafted player is ostensibly either an international draftee or a college draftee who is not signed by the team that drafted him, is allowed to sign with any non-NBA teams. In this case, the team retains the player's draft rights in the NBA until one year after the player's contract with the non-NBA team ends. This list includes draft rights that were acquired from trades with other teams.

Captains

Franchise leaders

Bold denotes still active with the team.

Italic denotes still active but not with the team.

Points scored (regular season) (as of the end of the 2021–22 season)

 1. John Havlicek (26,395)
 2. Paul Pierce (24,021)
 3. Larry Bird (21,791)
 4. Robert Parish (18,245)
 5. Kevin McHale (17,335)
 6. Bob Cousy (16,955)
 7. Sam Jones (15,411)
 8. Bill Russell (14,522)
 9. Dave Cowens (13,192)
 10. Jo Jo White (13,188)
 11. Bill Sharman (12,287)
 12. Tom Heinsohn (12,194)
 13. Antoine Walker (11,386)
 14. Don Nelson (9,968)
 15. Satch Sanders (8,766)
 16. Frank Ramsey (8,378)
 17. Cedric Maxwell (8,311)
 18. Reggie Lewis (7,902)
 19. Ed Macauley (7,882)
 20. Jayson Tatum (7,640)
 21. Dennis Johnson (6,805)
 22. Jaylen Brown (6,644)
 23. Danny Ainge (6,257)
 24. Kevin Garnett (6,233)
 25. Ray Allen (5,987)
 26. Bailey Howell (5,812)
 27. Rajon Rondo (5,783)
 28. Don Chaney (5,689)
 29. Dee Brown (5,512)
 30. Marcus Smart (5,438)
 31. Larry Siegfried (5,420)
 32. K.C. Jones (5,011)
 33. Avery Bradley (5,008)
 34. Kevin Gamble (4,895)
 35. Rick Fox (4,759) 
 36. Tiny Archibald (4,550)
 37. Isaiah Thomas (4,422)
 38. Eric Williams (4,248)
 39. Paul Silas (3,744)
 40. Dino Radja (3,733)
 41. Gerald Henderson (3,521)
 42. Al Horford (3,505)
 43. Jeff Green (3,252)
 44. Brandon Bass (3,216)
 45. Chris Ford (3,194)
 46. Jim Loscutoff (3,156)
 47. Dana Barros (3,109)
 48. Kyrie Irving (3,062)
 49. Sherman Douglas (2,981)
 50. Ricky Davis (2,940)

Other statistics (regular season) (as of the end of the 2021–22 season)

Coaches

Head coaches

There have been 18 head coaches in Celtics' history. Red Auerbach is the most successful franchise's head coach having won 9 NBA championships with the team. Celtics' legend Bill Russell took coaching duties from Auerbach and led them to 2 NBA championships while playing and coaching at the same time. The other two coaches that won 2 NBA titles with the team are Tom Heinsohn and K. C. Jones. Both Bill Fitch and Doc Rivers led the Celtics to 1 NBA championship the latter being the most recent coach to do so. Joe Mazzulla is the team's current head coach.

Logos and uniforms

Logos

The Boston Celtics logo since 1968 features a leprechaun spinning a basketball, named Lucky, originally depicted with a large basketball for a background. It was originally designed by Zang Auerbach, the brother of Celtics head coach Red Auerbach. Through the 1995–96 season, the logo's only colors were black, white and green. Then for the 1996–97 season, celebrating the club's 50th anniversary, the logo got a full-color treatment. Lucky's face and hands were both painted tan, while gold was included on the vest, bow tie and hat, as well as brown on the ball and shillelagh, and black on its pants and shoes.

The Celtics also have various alternative logos, with the most popular being a white shamrock with the letters "Celtics" above it, wrapped in a green circle, which has been used since the 1998–99 season. The alternate logo is based on logos used by the Celtics before they used the Zang Auerbach leprechaun. For much of its history, the shamrock was trimmed in gold, as seen in the old team warmup jackets. A new secondary logo, unveiled in 2014, featured a variation of the leprechaun logo, in silhouette form.

Uniforms

Primary uniforms

For much of their history, the Celtics wore green uniforms on the road and white uniforms at home. The basic template of the current Celtics' uniforms was formalized in the 1950s, and along the way they made a few adjustments in the lettering and stripes.

Among the more notable changes in the uniforms were the switch from serifed to sans-serif block lettering in 1968, the addition of names in 1972, and the incorporation of the three-leaf shamrock logo in 1998. While the white uniforms remained largely intact, the green uniforms have featured either the city name (1950s–1965; 2014–present) or the team name (1965–2014).

When Nike became the NBA's uniform provider in 2017, they decided to eliminate the "home" and "away" uniform designations. Thus the white Celtics uniforms became known as the "Association" uniforms while the green uniforms became the "Icon" uniforms. Both sets are now used regardless of home and road games.

In January 2017, the Celtics signed a multi-year deal with General Electric where they became the "exclusive Data and Analytics partner" for the team. As part of the deal, GE agreed to pay the Celtics more than $7 million per year to have the uniforms with a GE logo prominently placed on the left shoulder of jerseys in green and white. This was the first time a corporate logo were placed on the game uniforms. Along with the GE logo, the Nike logo now emblazons the right shoulder of the Celtics' uniforms.

In November 2020, the Celtics signed a multi-year deal with Vistaprint who became the main jersey sponsor of the team.

Alternate uniforms

From 2005 to 2017, the Celtics wore alternate green uniforms with black lettering and trim featuring the word "Boston" on the front side. One noticeable difference in the alternate uniforms was the black panels with a green shamrock, reminiscent of the original Celtics uniforms worn in the late 1940s.

A gray uniform set was also used from 2014 to 2017. Dubbed "Parquet Pride", the uniforms featured sleeves (a prominent figure in Adidas' NBA uniforms), white letters with green trim, the silhouetted leprechaun logo on the shorts, the shamrock logo on the left leg, and a parquet-like pattern on the sides.

For 2017 and beyond, the Celtics will wear black "Statement" uniforms (labeled by Nike in reference to the league's third jerseys). The uniform features a black base with "Celtics" in green lettering and white trim, and other than a few changes in the striping scheme, the uniform remained essentially the same. Starting in 2020, the "Statement" uniform would feature the Air Jordan brand logo, a feature previously exclusive to the Charlotte Hornets uniforms.

Special uniforms
Between 2006 and 2017, the Celtics wore special St. Patrick's Day uniforms. The initial uniforms were worn from 2006 to 2013 and it strongly resembled their regular green uniforms save for gold and white trim and the city name in front. For 2014 and 2015, the uniforms were sleeved, replaced the city name in front in favor of the team name, and now resembled their green/black alternates. In 2016 and 2017, the uniforms were again sleeveless and featured the city name in front, but kept the previous striping.

During the NBA Europe Live Tour prior to the 2007–08 season, the Celtics used the alternate road jerseys in their game against the Toronto Raptors in Rome, except that the words "Boston" on the front side of the jersey and the shamrock on the shorts and on the reverse side of the jersey contained the green, white and red tricolors of the Italian flag. In the second game in London, the regular road jerseys featured a patch containing the Union Jack.

At the 2008–09 season opener against the Cleveland Cavaliers, the Celtics wore a modified version of their home uniforms, accented with gold, to commemorate last season's championship team.

The Celtics have also worn special edition Christmas Day uniforms since the 2008–09 season. For the first four games, they wore their regular green uniforms modified with the NBA logo inside a snowflake. Then in the 2012–13 season, they wore monochrome uniforms with green lettering trimmed in white. For the 2016–17 season, the Celtics wore a special green uniform with a more ornate script lettering, but without the additional striping.

Starting with the 2017–18 season, the Celtics wore special edition "City" uniforms designed by Nike. Their first "City" uniforms were in gray and featured a pattern of the parquet floor throughout, a green shamrock with white trim on the left leg, green letters with white trim, Red Auerbach's signature near the uniform tag, and a portion of the 2008 championship banner on the beltline.

For the 2018–19 season, the Celtics wore white "City" uniforms with green letters and shamrocks trimmed in gold. It also has Red Auerbach's signature near the uniform tag and a gold-trimmed alternate Celtics logo on the beltline. In addition, the Celtics wore an "Earned" edition uniform exclusive only to the 16 teams that made the 2018 NBA playoffs. Their rendition is a palette swap of the "City" uniforms with a green base and gold letters and shamrocks with white trim.

The Celtics' "City" uniform for the 2019–20 season featured a green base and a stylized "Boston" wordmark and numbers in gold with black trim. A Celtic knot in the shape of a shamrock adorn the beltline.

The 2020–21 Celtics' "City" uniform was patterned after the 17 championship banners that adorn the TD Garden rafters. The uniform, which is white with thick green stripes, features the full name in Futura Condensed stacked in front, and Red Auerbach's signature and quote "The Boston Celtics are not a basketball team. They're a way of life." appears above the manufacturer's tag. The Celtics also released a second "Earned" uniform after qualifying in the 2020 NBA playoffs; this design features a dark green base with Celtic and lime green striping, and the letters were rendered in Celtic green with white trim.

The Celtics' green "City" uniform for the 2021–22 season was a mix of previous uniform designs. The neck and arm striping was taken from their current uniforms. The green lettering with white drop shadows was a nod to the 1949 uniform design. The gray triangles on the shorts represented the franchise's initial uniforms; the left side contained the team's 75th anniversary emblem, while the right side contained a green-and-white version of the Red Auerbach memorial shamrock used in the 2006–07 season. Contrasting nameplates on the back were inspired by the warmup jackets the team used for much of its history, and the original "jumping leprechaun" logo from the 1960s was added to the waist. Retired numbers, the Auerbach signature and quotation (see 2021 "City" uniform), and 17 shamrocks representing each championship season, surrounded the jock tag.

The 2022–23 "City" uniform served as a memorial to Bill Russell, who died on July 31. The uniform is dark green with metallic gold and black accents, and has the "Celtics" wordmark inspired by the Slade's Bar & Grill restaurant once owned by Russell. The black stripes contained 11 gold diamonds on each side, commemorating each of Russell's championships, and also featured a grayscale pattern of the parquet floor. The waistband contained Russell's jersey no. 6 surrounded by the 11 gold diamonds.

Memorial patches
During the 2006–07 season, the Celtics wore a commemorative patch of a black shamrock with the nickname "Red" in green letters on the right top of the jersey in remembrance of Red Auerbach, who died shortly prior to the beginning of the season.

The team has honored deceased members of the Celtics family with a commemorative black band on the left shoulder strap of the jersey. It has been featured ten times to date: Walter Brown (1964–65), Bob Schmertz (1975–76), Joan Cohen (1989–90), Johnny Most and Reggie Lewis (1993–94), Dorothy Auerbach (2000–01), Dennis Johnson (2006–07), Jim Loscutoff (2015–16), Jo Jo White (2017–18), John Havlicek (2018–19), Tom Heinsohn, and K. C. Jones (both 2020–21). During the 2019–20 season, the Celtics wore a black band in honor of two people who had never been part of the Celtics organization; former NBA commissioner David Stern and former Los Angeles Lakers star Kobe Bryant. The Celtics have also worn a black band for reasons not directly related to the franchise, such as the Boston Marathon bombing in 2013, and the death of Isaiah Thomas' younger sister during the 2017 NBA playoffs.

In the 2022–23 season, the Celtics joined the rest of the NBA in wearing the black no. 6 patch in memory of Bill Russell.

Uniform traditions
The team also had the tradition of wearing black sneakers through most of their history. According to legend, Celtics patriarch Red Auerbach had a problem with the white sneakers, claiming that the white sneakers can easily get dirty; hence starting a long tradition with the black sneakers. In the early 1970s, the Celtics changed their sneaker color to green, but by 1985, returned to the customary black due to the difficulty of producing the right shade of Celtic green.

Prior to the 2003–04 season, current Celtics general manager Danny Ainge and captain Paul Pierce suggested wearing white sneakers, in due part to a growing number of teams wearing black sneakers. Auerbach gladly accepted and the white sneakers have remained since on home games. They still wore the black sneakers on away games, but in the 2008–09 season, they wore white sneakers with green and gold accents while wearing their St. Patrick's Day jerseys on the road. Most recently, when the Celtics play on Christmas Day, they wore white or green sneakers with red and gold accents. Since the 2009–10 season, the NBA relaxed its rules on specified sneaker colors, and Celtics players are now seen wearing custom-made and personalized sneakers at home and on the road, although for the most part they wear either green, white or black sneakers.

The Celtics were the only team to wear warmup jackets with the player names on the back. During the 1980s, this style was dominant in most NBA warmup jackets, but by the late 1990s, this style gradually declined. The Celtics, however, kept the design in keeping with tradition, before discontinuing the practice after the 2011–12 season in favor of a templated jacket design common to all 30 teams.

Television and radio

NBC Sports Boston is the Boston Celtics' main television outlet, having aired its games since 1981 when the station was known as PRISM New England. In 1983, it rebranded as SportsChannel New England. Like all the other SportsChannel networks, the New England channel was rebranded as Fox Sports New England when former owner Cablevision entered into a partnership with Liberty Media and News Corporation in 1998. Comcast purchased Cablevision's original network stake in 2001, then acquired the remaining stake in what was now FSN New England in 2007 and rebranded the network as Comcast SportsNet New England. In 2017, all CSN networks (including CSN New England) were renamed as NBC Sports Regional Networks in reference to Comcast's current ownership of NBCUniversal.

Mike Gorman provides the play-by-play with former Celtics player Brian Scalabrine serving as analyst.

All Celtics games are heard on radio through Beasley Broadcast Group's WBZ-FM (98.5, otherwise branded as "The Sports Hub"), with play-by-play from Sean Grande and color commentary from Cedric Maxwell, a deal in place since the 2013–14 season. It is carried on stations in 5 of the 6 New England States via the Boston Celtics Radio Network.

Management

Ownership history

*Sale not approved by NBA

Team presidents

General managers

Other

Medical staff

Team physicians

Team athletic trainers

Boston Celtics Communications

Boston Celtics Communications is a broadcasting division of the Celtics. In September 1989, the team through its owners, Don Gaston, Alan N. Cohen and Paul Dupee acquired radio station WEEI (on the 590 frequency now known as WEZE) from CBS Radio, as well as Fox affiliated station WFXT from Fox Television Stations. The sale was completed on May 10, 1990.

CBS discontinued its association with WEEI that year, and they instead joined ABC Direction. WEEI, which had already carried Celtics broadcasts since 1987, expanded its sports programming to cover the Boston Bruins and certain Sports Byline USA and CBS Radio Sports broadcasts. However, WEEI was sold off in 1994, and would later reemerge as the name of an ESPN-radio affiliate, Sportsradio 850 WEEI.

WFXT continued to carry the Fox network programming; however, during the team's ownership of the station, they broadcast the team's games and they also had a news share agreement with regional cable news channel New England Cable News in 1993. WFXT meanwhile was reacquired by Fox Television Stations group, and once again was Fox owned-and-operated from 1995.

See also
 The Auerbach Center, official Celtics practice facility (opened June 2018)
 The Sports Museum (at TD Garden)
 Reebok Pro Summer League, a former summer league operated by the Celtics
 List of Boston Celtics head coaches
 Boston Celtics draft history
 Celtics–Lakers rivalry
 Celtics–Knicks rivalry
 Celtics–Pistons rivalry
 76ers–Celtics rivalry
 Boston Celtics all-time roster
 Boston Garden
 TD Garden
 Boston Celtics Radio Network
 Sports in Boston
 Sports in Massachusetts
 List of NBA champions

Notes

References

External links

 

 
Irish-American organizations
Irish-American culture in sports
Irish-American history
National Basketball Association teams
Basketball teams established in 1946
1946 establishments in Massachusetts
Celtics
Basketball Association of America teams